Flutter By, Butterfly is an album by the Kenny Wheeler Quintet recorded in 1987 and released on the Soul Note label.

Reception
The Allmusic review awarded the album 4 stars stating "each of the performances (which feature consistently rewarding solos) are worth hearing".

Track listing
All compositions by Kenny Wheeler
 "Everybody's Song But My Own" - 9:33  
 "We Salute the Night" - 5:11  
 "Miold Man"' - 9:21  
 "Flutter By, Butterfly" - 8:51  
 "Gigolo" - 8:23  
 "The Little Fella" - 7:13

Personnel
Kenny Wheeler - flugelhorn, cornet  
Stan Sulzmann - soprano saxophone, tenor saxophone, flute  
John Taylor - piano
Dave Holland - bass
Billy Elgart - drums

References

Kenny Wheeler albums
1988 albums
Black Saint/Soul Note albums